This article lists events from the year 2023 in Mozambique.

Incumbents 

 President: Filipe Nyusi
 Prime Minister: Adriano Maleiane

Events 
Ongoing – COVID-19 pandemic in Mozambique

 March 12 – Cyclone Freddy impacts Mozambique.

See also 

2022–23 South-West Indian Ocean cyclone season
COVID-19 pandemic in Africa
Islamic State of Iraq and the Levant
Al-Shabaab (militant group)

References 

 
2020s in Mozambique
Years of the 21st century in Mozambique
Mozambique